Haisyn or Haysyn is a city in central Ukraine, the administrative center of the Haisyn Raion in Vinnytsia Oblast. Its population is  It is located in the eastern part of the historical region of Podolia.

History
Hajsyn was first mentioned in 1545. In 1566 it became part of the Bracław Voivodeship of Poland, and remained so until was annexed by the Russian Empire during the Second Partition of Poland. In 1744, King Augustus III granted Haisyn city rights. It was a royal city of Poland.

Climate

Gallery

References

External links
 The murder of the Jews of Haisyn during World War II, at Yad Vashem website
  

Cities in Vinnytsia Oblast
Cities of district significance in Ukraine
Gaysinsky Uyezd
Holocaust locations in Ukraine